The Skåne lockbow was an early form of crossbow from Skåne or Scania, then a province of Denmark. (It has been part of southern Sweden since 1658.) An example was discovered in 1941 in Sweden dating from the 16th century, but seems to be similar to earlier models. The lockbow was used throughout northern Europe between ca. 900-1600 CE. It worked by drawing the bowstring back into a groove, from which it was dislodged by a wooden peg attached to the top of one end of a wooden lever. The upper part of the peg was pushed sharply upward, through a hole drilled underneath the groove holding the bowstring.

References

Bibliography

Payne-Gallwey, Sir Ralph, The Crossbow, Dover Press, reprinted 1995
Wilson, G M (ed.) & Bartlett Wells, H (trans.); European crossbows: a survey, Royal Armouries, 1994
Nicolle, D; Arms and Armour of the Crusading Era 1050–1350, Greenhill Books,1999
Sandy K. Albritton Crossbow Reviews and Guide 2010
Paterson, W. F.; A guide to the crossbow, Society of Archer Antiquaries, 1990

Crossbows
Scania